Anu Haasan (born Anuradha Chandrahaasan on 16 July 1970) is an Indian actress and TV anchor. She made her film debut in the critically acclaimed Indira (1995) and has since appeared in many Tamil films, playing minor roles. She hosted the celebrity talk show Koffee with Anu on the Tamil channel Vijay for three seasons.

Early life
Anu Hasan was born on 15 July 1970 to Chandrahasan, the brother of actors Kamal Haasan and Charuhasan. Anu is the cousin of film actresses Suhasini Maniratnam, Shruti Haasan and Akshara Haasan.

Anu did her schooling at St.Joseph's Anglo Indian Girls Higher Secondary School, Trichy and RSK Higher Secondary School and earned a MSc degree in Physics and Management from Birla Institute of Technology and Science (BITS), Pilani, Rajasthan.

Personal life
Anu Hasan married Shri Vikas in 1995 and the couple divorced in 1999. After living alone for around 11 years, she married her long-time British friend Graham Jay in 2010 in a private wedding ceremony. Anu and Graham met on a music website, and their friendship eventually ended up in love, and then marriage. They divorced in 2014

Career
By 2000, she ventured into television, acting first in the series Anbulla Snehgidhiye, which was adapted from Chitra Banerjee Divakaruni's award-winning novel Sister of My Heart. She then starred in a number of TV series like Avan Aval Avargal, Ammaavukku Rendula Raagu and Vivahita (Malayalam), following which she turned anchor for the celebrity talk show Koffee with Anu (named after herself), aired on STAR Vijay. The show, which she hosted for over four years, soon became very popular and made her ultimately a household name in Tamil Nadu.

In 2014 she joined the Ask How India social movement and made a series of videos pertaining to social issues.

In addition, Anu has worked as a dubbing artiste, lending her voice for many non-Tamil-speaking actresses, including Raveena Tandon, Preity Zinta and Geetu Mohandas.

She writes a monthly column for Just for Women (India) magazine.

Author

Books
Sunny Side Up (2015) – Self Help English Book.

Filmography

Films

Television

Dubbing artist
Preity Zinta (Uyire)
Raveena Tandon (Aalavandhan)
Geethu Mohandas (Nala Damayanthi)*

References

External links

 
 About Anu Hasan

Tamil actresses
Indian film actresses
Living people
1970 births
Television personalities from Tamil Nadu
Actresses from Tiruchirappalli
Tamil Nadu State Film Awards winners
Indian women television presenters
Indian television presenters
Birla Institute of Technology and Science, Pilani alumni
Actresses in Tamil cinema
Actresses in Malayalam cinema